The World Club Water Polo Challenge was an annual four-day international water polo event, staged at the Drummoyne Swimming Centre in Sydney, Australia from 2014.
This competition was held three times from 2014 to 2016.

History

References

External links
 
 

International water polo competitions
International water polo competitions hosted by Australia
Sports competitions in Sydney
Recurring sporting events established in 2014
2014 establishments in Australia
Sports club competitions
Multi-national professional sports leagues